Be (Б б italics: Б б) is a letter of the Cyrillic script. It should not be confused with the Cyrillic letter Ve  (В в), which is shaped like Latin capital letter B but represents the voiced labiodental fricative . The Cyrillic letter Б (Be) is romanized using the Latin letter B.

History
The Cyrillic letters Be and Ve (В в) were both derived from the Greek letter Beta (Β β).

In the Cyrillic numeral system, the letter Be had no numeric value because the letter Ve inherited the Greek letter Beta's numeric value.

Form
The Russian small letter б (be) is similar (but not identical) in shape to the digit 6. Its lowercase form also somewhat resembles a lowercase letter B ("b"), the letter to which it corresponds in the Latin alphabet. After all, the lowercase letter B ("b") developed from scribal alterations to the capital letter B ("B"), just as б did from scribal alterations to the capital letter В.

In Serbian and Macedonian the italic form is allowed to vary, but the regular should look like in other languages.

The cursive form of the lowercase letter Be resembles the lowercase Greek letter Delta (δ), but they are slightly different in their upper portions.

Usage

In Russian and Bulgarian, the letter Be generally represents the voiced bilabial plosive , but word-finally or before a voiceless consonant, it also represents the voiceless . Before a palatalizing vowel, it represents .

In Mari, it may represent either /b/ or the voiced bilabial fricative .

In Serbian, the letter represents the voiced bilabial plosive /b/, regardless of the position in the word.

Related letters and other similar characters

Computing codes

References

External links

Cyrillic letters